Wendy West is an American television producer and writer. She worked on the Showtime drama Dexter as a writer and producer, and been nominated multiple times for Primetime Emmy Awards and two Writers Guild of America (WGA) Awards for her work.

Biography
West graduated from Carleton College.  While there, she was active in theater and directed John Guare's "Six Degrees of Separation."

West began working in television for the first season of Law & Order: Special Victims Unit. She also worked as a co-producer and writer for Gideon's Crossing and The Practice.

She gained a further production role as a supervising producer and writer for The Closer.

She became a supervising producer and writer for the fourth season of the Showtime drama Dexter in autumn 2009 and was nominated for the Writers Guild of America (WGA) Award for Best Drama Series at the February 2010 ceremony for that work. She was promoted to co-executive producer for the fifth season in 2010 and continued to write episodes.

Filmography

References

External links

American television producers
American women television producers
American television writers
Living people
American women television writers
Place of birth missing (living people)
Year of birth missing (living people)
Carleton College alumni
21st-century American women